The  Miss Iowa USA competition is the pageant that selects the representative for the state of Iowa in the Miss USA pageant. It is directed by Future Productions based in Savage, Minnesota since 2008.

While Iowa has not been greatly successful in the past four decades, they were one of the most consistent states in the first decade of the pageant's existence.  The second Miss USA to win the Miss Universe Crown was Carol Morris of Iowa in 1956. The most recent placement was Baylee Drezek in 2019, placing Top 15.

Jamie Solinger, Miss Teen USA 1992 and Miss Iowa USA 1998, crowned her sister Jaclyn Solinger as Miss Iowa USA 1999.

The current titleholder is Randi Estabrook of Mitchellville and was crowned on May 21, 2022 at Des Moines Marriott Downtown in Des Moines. She represented Iowa for the title of Miss USA 2022.

Gallery of titleholders

Results summary

Placements
Miss USA: Carol Morris (1956)
5th Runner-up: Carlyn Bradarich (2014)
Top 10/12: Jan Hoyer (1993), Jensie Grigsby (2000)
Top 14/15/19/20: Marilyn Shonka (1953), Ione Lucken (1954), Judy Hall (1957), Kay Nielson (1959), Trudy Shulkin (1960), Baylee Drezek (2019)

Iowa holds a record of 10 placements at Miss USA.

Awards
Miss Congeniality: Dana Ruth Mintzer (1983), Rebecca Hodge (2012)

Winners 
Color key

1 Age at the time of the Miss USA pageant

References

External links

Iowa
Iowa culture
Women in Iowa
Recurring events established in 1952
1952 establishments in Iowa
Annual events in Iowa